Napoli milionaria may refer to:

 Side Street Story (Italian: Napoli milionaria), a 1950 Italian comedy film
 Napoli milionaria (opera), a 1977 opera